Magic Man is a 2010 thriller film directed by Stuart Cooper and starring Billy Zane and Alexander Nevsky.

Cast
 Billy Zane as Darius
 Alexander Nevsky as Detective Orloff
 Robert Davi as Simpson
 Bai Ling as Samantha
 Armand Assante as Lieutenant Taper
 Estelle Raskin as Tatiana
Veronica Powers as Young Tatiana
 Christina Vidal as Elena, The First Victim
 Andrew Divoff as Rudolph Treadwell
 Sarah Jayne Jensen as Vera
 Richard Tyson as Detective Rogers
 Brandon Molale as Darryl

References

External links
 

2010 films
2010 thriller films
Films about magic and magicians
Films scored by the Newton Brothers
American thriller films
2010s English-language films
2010s American films